General Schmidt may refer to:

Arthur Schmidt (general) (1895–1987), German Wehrmacht lieutenant general
August Schmidt (Luftwaffe) (1883–1955), German Luftwaffe general of artillery
August Schmidt (Wehrmacht) (1892–1972), German Wehrmacht lieutenant general
Erich-Otto Schmidt (1899–1959), German Wehrmacht major general
Gustav Schmidt (general) (1894–1943), German Wehrmacht lieutenant general
Hans Schmidt (general of the Infantry) (1877–1948), German Wehrmacht general of infantry
Hans Schmidt (general) (1895–1971), German Wehrmacht lieutenant general
Harry Schmidt (USMC) (1886–1968), U.S. Marine Corps four-star general
Karl von Schmidt (1817–1875), Prussian cavalry general
Kurt Schmidt (1891–1945), German Wehrmacht lieutenant general
Michael J. Schmidt (fl. 1990s–2020s), U.S. Air Force major general
Randall Schmidt (fl. 1970s–2000s), U.S. Air Force lieutenant general
Rudolf Schmidt (1886–1957), German Wehrmacht colonel general
William R. Schmidt (1889–1966), U.S. Army major general

See also
Dmitry Shmidt (1896–1937), Soviet Army komdiv (equivalent to lieutenant general)
Herman Alfred Schmid (1910–1985), U.S. Air Force brigadier general
Josef Schmid (flight surgeon) (born 1965), U.S. Air Force Reserves major general
Joseph Schmid (1901–1956), German Luftwaffe lieutenant general
Otto Schmidt-Hartung (1892–1976), German Wehrmacht lieutenant general
Werner Schmidt-Hammer (1894–1962), German Wehrmacht lieutenant general
Attorney General Schmidt (disambiguation)